The Americas Zone is one of the three zones of regional Davis Cup competition in 2008.

In the Americas Zone there are three different groups in which teams compete against each other to advance to the next group.

Participating nations

Seeds:

Remaining Nations

Draw 

Mexico relegated to Group II in 2009.
Chile and Brazil advance to World Group Play-off.

First round

Canada vs. Mexico

Uruguay vs. Colombia

Second round

Chile vs. Canada

Brazil vs. Colombia

Second round playoffs

Mexico vs. Uruguay

References
Draw

Americas Zone Group I
Davis Cup Americas Zone